Beatrix Pesek is a Hungarian ten-pin bowler. She finished in 24th position of the combined rankings at the 2006 AMF World Cup.

See also
Glossary of bowling
List of ten-pin bowlers
List of world bowling champions
Open bowling

References

External links
 Bowlingdigital.com

Living people
Year of birth missing (living people)
Hungarian bowling players
Ten-pin bowling in Hungary
Ten-pin bowling players
Place of birth missing (living people)